James F. Keenan  is a moral theologian, bioethicist, writer, and the Canisius Professor of theology at Boston College.

Career 
Keenan has been a Jesuit of the New York Province since 1970 and an ordained priest since 1982. He received his B.A. at Fordham University in the Bronx, NY, in 1976, after which he pursued his Masters in Divinity (M.Div.) at the Weston School of Theology in Cambridge, MA. After receiving his M.Div. and ordination in 1982, James Keenan went on to study at the Gregorian University in Rome, Italy, receiving his S.T.L in 1984 and his S.T.D. in 1988.
 
James Keenan has taught as an Assistant Professor of Moral Theology at Fordham University ('87-'91) and Weston Jesuit School of Theology ('91-'99). He taught as Professor of Moral Theology at the Weston Jesuit School of Theology from 1999 to 2005, after which he became a full-time member of the Boston College Theology Department as a Professor of Theological Ethics.

Bioethics 
Keenan has been actively involved in the field of bioethics and has particular experience with bioethics concerning HIV/AIDS.    He teaches such Ethics courses as "The Human Body" and "Ethical Issues of HIV/AIDS" at Boston College. Keenan has been an Advisor to the Global AIDS Interfaith Alliance since 2000, and has been a Group Leader for the Surgeon General's Task Force on Responsible Sexual Conduct (2000-2002), a Convener for the AIDS Study Group, Society of Christian Ethics (1996-2001), and is a director on the Board of Directors for the Society of Christian Ethics (2001-), among other positions.

Other issues
In a June 18, 2018 article for Chicago Catholic, Keenan argued that US Attorney General Jeff Sessions had misconstrued Paul's admonition for Christians to obey lawful authority, when Sessions cited Romans 13 in defense of the Trump administration's policy of separating migrant families.

Publications 
Keenan is a columnist for Chicago Catholic, the newspaper of the Archdiocese of Chicago.

Keenan has written numerous books on HIV/AIDS, some of which are mentioned above, and has contributed articles to several books, periodicals, and studies concerning HIV/AIDS, including "Higher Education in a Time of HIV/AIDS" The list includes books such as Catholic Ethicists on HIV/AIDS Prevention published in 2000 (for which he won the Alpha Sigma Nu National Book Award in 2002 ), Moral Wisdom: Lessons and Texts from the Catholic Tradition (2004 - second edition 2009), Paul and Virtue Ethics (co-authored with Daniel Harrington, 2010), and Goodness and Rightness in Thomas Aquinas' Summa Theologiae (1992). Some recent academic essays include "A Reconciling Work in the AIDS Century", "HIV/AIDS: The Expanding Ethical Challenge", "Theological Ethics out of the United States", and "'Ethics' After Augustine. A Survey of His Reception from 430-2000", which is to be published by the Oxford University Press. Keenan has also contributed many articles to such general periodicals as Commonweal, Church, and America - mostly, but not exclusively, concerning either ethics or bioethics. James Keenan is also a Series Editor of Moral Traditions (Georgetown University Press, 1993-).

Other Awards and Positions 

Gasson Chair - Boston College; Tuohy Chair - John Carroll University; Board of Directors - Society of Christian Ethics; Grant and Faculty Fellowship - Association of Theological Schools; Editorial Board Member of Theological Studies (1991 -); Chair - Catholic Theological Coalition on HIV/AIDS Prevention (1997 -); Fellow - Center of Theological Inquiry, Princeton University

References 

Living people
20th-century American Jesuits
21st-century American Jesuits
American male writers
American theologians
Christian ethicists
Bioethicists
Boston College alumni
Boston College faculty
Year of birth missing (living people)